Hao Jiachen (born 7 May 1990) is a Chinese speed skater. She competed in the women's 3000 metres at the 2018 Winter Olympics.

References

1990 births
Living people
Chinese female speed skaters
Olympic speed skaters of China
Speed skaters at the 2018 Winter Olympics
Place of birth missing (living people)